Matthew Bell (born 3 January 1992) is a British Virgin Islands international footballer who plays as a midfielder for English  side Nantwich Town.

He came through the youth team at Port Vale, and has played for Mansfield Town, Stafford Rangers, Leek Town, Solihull Moors, Kidsgrove Athletic and Nantwich Town.

Club career
Bell came through the youth ranks at Port Vale and turned professional with the League Two club under Micky Adams in April 2010. However, he failed to make a first team appearance at Vale Park and was released in May 2011.

He signed a one-year contract with Conference National club Mansfield Town in June 2011. Manager Paul Cox stated that "He has a lovely left foot, is tenacious, has high fitness levels and can play at left-back, left-midfield and even in central midfield". He was loaned out to Northern Premier League side Stafford Rangers in December 2011 and Leek Town in March 2012.

He signed with Kidsgrove Athletic in February 2015. He joined Nantwich Town in May 2015. He helped the "Dabbers" to reach the semi-finals of the FA Trophy in 2015–16, scoring 12 goals in all competitions, and then to qualify for the Northern Premier League play-offs the following season, scoring eight goals from 51 appearances. This season also saw him collect the Players Player of the Year award for his performances. He lifted the Cheshire Senior Cup after scoring in a 3–0 win over Stockport Town in the 2018 final. He also played and scored in the 2019 final, a 5–2 victory over Cammell Laird 1907. He also helped the "Dabbers" to reach the 2018–19 play-offs, where they were beaten by Warrington Town in the semi-finals.

Bell re-joined Leek Town in October 2019, ending his Nantwich Town record with 31 goals from 199 competitive appearances. As a result of the COVID-19 pandemic in England, the 2019–20 Northern Premier League Division One South East season was formally abandoned on 26 March 2020, with all results from the season being expunged. He scored five goals from eleven games in the 2020–21 season, which was also curtailed early due to the pandemic on 24 February 2021. He made 13 appearances at the start of the 2021–22 season, scoring one goal, before he re-signed with Nantwich Town on 12 December. He played 18 times for Nantwich in the second half of the season.

International career
Bell was called up to the British Virgin Islands squad and made his debut on 26 March 2015, in a 3–2 defeat to Dominica at Windsor Park in the First Round of qualifying for the 2018 FIFA World Cup. He played in the reverse fixture three days later, a 0–0 draw which eliminated the British Virgin Islands from the competition.

Career statistics

Honours
Nantwich Town
Cheshire Senior Cup: 2018, 2019

References

1992 births
Living people
Footballers from Stoke-on-Trent
British Virgin Islands footballers
British Virgin Islands international footballers
Association football fullbacks
Association football midfielders
Association football utility players
Port Vale F.C. players
Mansfield Town F.C. players
Leek Town F.C. players
Stafford Rangers F.C. players
Solihull Moors F.C. players
Kidsgrove Athletic F.C. players
Nantwich Town F.C. players
National League (English football) players
Northern Premier League players